Purmerend Overwhere is a suburb railway station in Purmerend, Netherlands. The station opened in 1971, and lies 2 km north of Purmerend. The station is on the Zaandam–Enkhuizen railway.

Train services
The following train services call at Purmerend Overwhere:
2x per hour local service (sprinter) Hoofddorp - Schiphol - Zaandam - Hoorn Kersenboogerd

From December 2008, the direct connection with Amsterdam Centraal was lost, due to the Stoptrain 4500 becoming an Intercity, not stopping between Amsterdam Sloterdijk and Hoorn. Therefore, it is recommended to travel to Zaandam/Amsterdam Sloterdijk and change for central Amsterdam.

External links
NS website 
Dutch Public Transport journey planner 

Railway stations opened in 1971
Railway stations in North Holland
1971 establishments in the Netherlands
Purmerend
Railway stations in the Netherlands opened in the 20th century